Marin Tomasov (born 31 August 1987) is a Croatian footballer who plays as a winger or an attacking midfielder for the Kazakh club FC Astana.

Club career
Coming from the village of Dobropoljana, on the island of Pašman, Tomasov entered the youth ranks of NK Sveti Mihovil, on the neighboring island of Ugljan, which represents both islands. Some years after, Tomasov was brought up through the NK Zadar youth academy and in 2006 he signed a professional contract with the senior team and was assigned the number 14 jersey. In the three seasons he spent at the club, spanning from 2006 to 2009, he made 72 appearances scoring 12 goals. His 2008–09 Prva HNL season was especially impressive and Croatian giants Hajduk Split were quick to snap him up in a deal worth over 350,000 euros in the summer of 2009. At his new club he retained his jersey number of 14 which he wore at NK Zadar.

Hajduk Split
In his first season at his new club, he found himself in and out of the starting line-up appearing 22 times in both league and cup games but only 11 of these were from the starting line-up. He managed only two goals in all of the 2009–10 Prva HNL and even though he was only 20 years old at the time, he stated himself that he was disappointed with his season and will be looking to improve in the future.

His 2010–11 season was just that. In the league he made 26 total appearances, 15 of which were starts and scored four goals but where he grabbed the most attention was his performances in the 2010–11 UEFA Europa League where he grabbed two goals in nine games and starred throughout the competition in both the group stage games and qualifying.

Tomasov started the 2011–12 Prva HNL season in exhilarating fashion scoring the winner in the opening game against HNK Šibenik in the 87th minute. His next goal came three games later when he scored the first in a 3–0 away win against NK Istra 1961. He also scored the next match in a home game against NK Zagreb where he grabbed the opener, scoring inside 50 seconds of the start of the match. He grabbed the opener again in the next match in the Split derby against RNK Split making it the third consecutive game in which he scored the opener, this time in the second minute.

1860 München
In July 2012, Tomasov joined German 2nd Bundesliga side TSV 1860 München on a three-year contract.

Rijeka
On 10 January 2015, Tomasov signed a -year contract with HNK Rijeka in Croatia's Prva HNL. In his first season with the club he was prolific, netting 7 goals in 15 league appearances and one goal in three cup fixtures. He continued in the same fashion in the 2015–16 season. He scored both of Rijeka's goals in a 2–0 away win against RNK Split. He also scored from a free-kick and collected two assists in Rijeka's 3–0 away thumping of his former club, Hajduk Split. Tomasov's performances during 2015 did not go unnoticed and earned him the Prva HNL Player of the Year award. He was chosen as the best player in the league by captains of all Croatian First Football League clubs. He finished the 2015–16 season with 8 league goals and 12 assists to his account (the highest in the league). He was also the top scorer in the 2015–16 Croatian Football Cup with 5 goals. During the season, Tomasov did not miss a single match, collecting 43 appearances in as many competitive fixtures.

Al-Nassr (loan)
On 5 August 2016, Rijeka and Al-Nassr agreed terms for Tomasov's transfer to the Saudi club, with the deal valued at €2.8 million. In the first instance, Tomasov was loaned to the Saudi club until June 2017 for a fee of €800,000. The Saudi club then had an option to buy his contract outright for the remaining €2 million.

Astana (loan)
On 1 July 2017, Astana announced the signing of Tomasov on a year-long loan deal from Rijeka.

Following the end of the loan, on 4 July 2018 Tomasov was transferred from Rijeka to Astana for a fee of €500,000. In his first full season with Astana, Tomasov scored 19 goals in 47 games in all competitions, his 14 league goals helping his club to the 2018 Kazakhstan Premier League title.

In the 2019 FC Astana season, Tomasov was again the top goalscorer for his club, with 19 league goals and 7 Europa League goals. In the Round 31 league match against FC Aktobe, Tomasov scored 4 goals in 33 minutes in a 5–0 win. Astana confirmed a sixth consecutive league title with one round to spare and Tomasov was the league's top goalscorer.

International career
Between 2007 and 2008, Tomasov was capped nine times and scored one goal for Croatia national under-21 football team. He has one cap for the Croatian national football team, earned in the 2–1 away win against South Korea on 10 September 2013.

Career statistics

Club

Honours
Zadar
Druga HNL play-off winner: 2006–07

Hajduk Split
Croatian Cup: 2009–10
Croatian Super Cup runner-up: 2010

Astana
Kazakhstan Premier League: 2017, 2018, 2019, 2022
Kazakhstan Super Cup: 2018, 2019, 2020, 2019, 2023

Individual
Croatian Football Hope of the Year: 2008
Tportal Prva HNL Player of the Year: 2015
Croatian Cup Top Scorer: 2015–16
Croatian First Football League Most Assists: 2015–16
Kazakhstan Premier League Most Assists: 2018
 Kazakhstan Premier League Top Scorer:  2021

References

External links
 

1987 births
Living people
Sportspeople from Zadar
Association football wingers
Croatian footballers
Croatia under-21 international footballers
Croatia international footballers
NK Zadar players
HNK Hajduk Split players
TSV 1860 Munich players
HNK Rijeka players
Al Nassr FC players
FC Astana players
Croatian Football League players
2. Bundesliga players
Saudi Professional League players
Kazakhstan Premier League players
Croatian expatriate footballers
Expatriate footballers in Germany
Croatian expatriate sportspeople in Germany
Expatriate footballers in Saudi Arabia
Croatian expatriate sportspeople in Saudi Arabia
Expatriate footballers in Kazakhstan
Croatian expatriate sportspeople in Kazakhstan